The men's 50 metre backstroke S5 event at the 2012 Paralympic Games took place on 6 September, at the London Aquatics Centre.

Three heats were held, each with six swimmers. The swimmers with the eight fastest times advanced to the final.

Heats

Heat 1

Heat 2

Heat 3

Final

References

Swimming at the 2012 Summer Paralympics